Oak River is an unincorporated community recognized as a local urban district in the Rural Municipality of Blanshard, western Manitoba, Canada.

History
Oak River was laid out in about 1889 when the railroad was extended to that point.

References

Local urban districts in Manitoba